Primož Brezec (born October 2, 1979) is a Slovenian retired professional basketball player. He is a 7 ft 1 in (2.16 m) tall center. Brezec has played eight seasons in the NBA.

Professional career

Europe/Asia
Brezec grew up in Sežana, where he also made his professional debut with the local team Kraski Zidar. During his high school years, he was a member of the basketball team and a major star of the ŠKL League, the national high school league. As a professional, he played for the Slovenian Premier A League club Union Olimpija Ljubljana from 1998 until 2001.

Brezec spent the next 7 seasons playing in the NBA in the United States and Canada. He returned to Europe on July 20, 2008, when he signed a 2-year contract with Lottomatica Roma of the Italian league.

On September 26, 2010, Brezec signed with BC Krasnye Krylya Samara of the Russian Professional Basketball League.

In July 2011, he signed with Lokomotiv Kuban for one season, but he was waived in February 2012.

In March 2012, he signed with BC Nizhny Novgorod.

On February 10, 2015, he signed a two-month deal with AEK Larnaca of the Cyprus Basketball Division 1. He won the title in Cyprus with AEK Larnaca averaging 14.9 points and 7 rebounds per game.

On May 7, 2015, after his contract expired, he signed with Al Kuwait of the Kuwaiti Division I Basketball League.

On June 18, 2015, he re-signed with AEK Larnaca.

On September 2, 2017, he announced his retirement from professional basketball, and joined the Cleveland Cavaliers as international scout.

NBA

Brezec was chosen by the Indiana Pacers with the 27th overall pick of the 2000 NBA draft. After he spent three years in Indiana with little playing time, he was picked up in the 2004 NBA Expansion Draft by the Charlotte Bobcats. As the Bobcats' starting center, Brezec averaged career-highs of 13.0 points and 7.4 rebounds per game during the 2004–05 NBA season. He also scored the first points, made the first turnover, and hit the first free-throws in the history of the franchise.

On December 14, 2007, Brezec, along with Bobcats teammate Wálter Herrmann, was traded to the Detroit Pistons for center Nazr Mohammed.

At the 2008 NBA trade deadline, which was on February 21, Brezec, along with cash considerations, was traded to the Toronto Raptors in exchange for Juan Dixon. During his Raptors debut, he hit all five of his shots and finished with 11 points, three rebounds and a block in 13 minutes off the bench against the New York Knicks in a February 24 win.

In August 2009, he returned to the NBA when he signed with the Philadelphia 76ers.

On February 18, 2010, Brezec was traded to the Milwaukee Bucks along with Royal Ivey in exchange for Jodie Meeks and Francisco Elson. His final NBA game was played on May 2nd, 2010 in Game 7 of the Eastern Conference First Round against the Atlanta Hawks. The Bucks lost the game 74 - 95, (thus losing the series) with Brezec recording 5 points and 2 rebounds.

National team career

Brezec has also been a member of the senior Slovenian national basketball team. With Slovenia's senior national team, he has played at the 2003 FIBA European Championship, the 2005 FIBA European Championship, the 2006 FIBA World Championship, and the 2010 FIBA World Championship.

NBA career statistics

Regular season

|-
| align="left" | 
| align="left" | Indiana
| 22 || 4 || 7.3 || .483 || .000 || .600 || 1.3 || .3 || .0 || .3 || 2.0
|-
| align="left" | 
| align="left" | Indiana
| 22 || 1 || 5.0 || .395 || .000 || .600 || 1.0 || .2 || .1 || .2 || 1.9
|-
| align="left" | 
| align="left" | Indiana
| 18 || 0 || 4.0 || .462 || .000 || .667 || .8 || .2 || .0 || .2 || 1.6
|-
| align="left" | 
| align="left" | Charlotte
| 72 || 72 || 31.6 || .512 || .000 || .745 || 7.4 || 1.2 || .5 || .8 || 13.0
|-
| align="left" | 
| align="left" | Charlotte
| 79 || 79 || 27.4 || .517 || .000 || .732 || 5.6 || .6 || .2 || .4 || 12.4
|-
| align="left" | 
| align="left" | Charlotte
| 58 || 40 || 14.4 || .445 || .333 || .632 || 3.2 || .4 || .2 || .4 || 5.0
|-
| align="left" | 
| align="left" | Charlotte
| 20 || 18 || 13.4 || .395 || .000 || .600 || 2.2 || .3 || .0 || .2 || 1.9
|-
| align="left" | 
| align="left" | Detroit
| 17 || 0 || 5.8 || .769 || .000 || .500 || 1.1 || .2 || .1 || .1 || 1.6
|-
| align="left" | 
| align="left" | Toronto
| 13 || 0 || 8.5 || .447 || .000 || .667 || 1.4 || .1 || .1 || .2 || 3.7
|-
| align="left" | 
| align="left" | Philadelphia
| 7 || 0 || 5.1 || .154 || .000 || .500 || 1.7 || .0 || .1 || .1 || .7
|-
| align="left" | 
| align="left" | Milwaukee
| 14 || 0 || 4.2 || .538 || .000 || .000 || .9 || .1 || .0 || .1 || 1.0
|- class="sortbottom"
| style="text-align:center;" colspan="2"| Career
| 342 || 214 || 18.1 || .498 || .167 || .701 || 3.9 || .5 || .2 || .4 || 7.2

Playoffs

|-
| align="left" | 2010
| align="left" | Milwaukee
| 4 || 0 || 6.3 || .571 || .000 || .500 || .8 || .0 || .3 || .0 || 2.3

References

External links

 Eurobasket.com Profile 
 Euroleague.net Profile
 Interbasket.net Profile
 FIBA.com Profile
 

1979 births
Living people
BC Krasnye Krylia players
BC Nizhny Novgorod players
Centers (basketball)
Charlotte Bobcats expansion draft picks
Charlotte Bobcats players
Cleveland Cavaliers scouts
Detroit Pistons players
Indiana Pacers draft picks
Indiana Pacers players
KK Olimpija players
National Basketball Association players from Slovenia
National Basketball Association scouts from Europe
Milwaukee Bucks players
Pallacanestro Virtus Roma players
PBC Lokomotiv-Kuban players
People from Sežana
Philadelphia 76ers players
Slovenian basketball scouts
Slovenian expatriate basketball people in Canada
Slovenian expatriate basketball people in Italy
Slovenian expatriate basketball people in the United States
Slovenian men's basketball players
Toronto Raptors players
2006 FIBA World Championship players
2010 FIBA World Championship players